Zentia was a Free-To-Play global MMORPG that takes place in a Chinese fairy tale world, described by its creators as "charmingly hardcore." The game was jointly produced by Changyou and Pixel Soft. Pixel Soft originally debuted the game in China. Changyou implemented a major revamp for North American audiences, which, among other changes, introduced more humor and social aspects. Open Beta for the North American version began October 13, 2010.  The North American version of Zentia officially closed at 11:59 PM PDT on August 13, 2012.

Overview
Zentia featured a humorous comic book style in 3D, unique characters, and a unique social leveling feature that required the entire community to work together to open higher-level game content. New players chose one of 24 pre-made characters, each of which represents a different immortal hero sent to banish the world of demons. The game had a pet system where nearly half of all creatures encountered can be tamed as pets or mounts. Individual mounts can carry anywhere from one to ten players. The game also included a rich crafting system and many PvP options. The guild system is extensive, acting as a larger clan which contains smaller clans, turning those clans into a sort of alliance. Along with a guild comes a guild city that holds quests, instances, and NPCs. Players could choose among various classes that had different basic mechanics.

References

External links
 Zentia Official Website
 Zentia Forums
 Massively.com Review
 Youtube Channel 

2010 video games
Fantasy massively multiplayer online role-playing games
 Free online games
 Inactive massively multiplayer online games
 Massively multiplayer online role-playing games